Straußfurt is a Verwaltungsgemeinschaft ("collective municipality") in the district of Sömmerda, in Thuringia, Germany. The seat of the Verwaltungsgemeinschaft is in Straußfurt.

The Verwaltungsgemeinschaft Straußfurt consists of the following municipalities:
Gangloffsömmern 
Haßleben 
Riethnordhausen 
Schwerstedt 
Straußfurt
Werningshausen 
Wundersleben

References

Verwaltungsgemeinschaften in Thuringia